Shahrak-e Mustafa Khomeyni (also Romanized as Shahrak-e Muṣṭafa Khomeynī) is a village in Qaemabad Rural District, in the Central District of Shahriar County, Tehran Province, Iran. At the 2006 census, its population was 10,807, in 2,654 families.

References 

Populated places in Shahriar County